The 1968 United States Senate election in Vermont took place on November 5, 1968. Incumbent Republican George Aiken ran successfully for re-election to another term in the United States Senate; he was unopposed. As of 2022, this is the last time the Republicans won the Class 3 Senate seat in Vermont.

Aiken spent $17.09 during the campaign.

Republican primary

Candidates
George Aiken, incumbent U.S. Senator
William K. Tufts, teacher

Results

Democratic primary

Results

General election

Results

See also 
 1968 United States Senate elections

References

Vermont
1968
United States Senate
Single-candidate elections